The following is a list of the 240 communes of the Mayenne department of France.

The communes cooperate in the following intercommunalities (as of 2020):
Communauté d'agglomération Laval Agglomération
Communauté de communes du Bocage Mayennais
Communauté de communes des Coëvrons
Communauté de communes de l'Ernée
Communauté de communes Mayenne Communauté
Communauté de communes du Mont des Avaloirs
Communauté de communes du Pays de Château-Gontier
Communauté de communes du Pays de Craon
Communauté de communes du Pays de Meslay-Grez
Communauté de communes de Sablé-sur-Sarthe (partly)

References

Mayenne